Jungiella is a genus of fly belonging to the family Psychodidae.

The genus was first described by Vaillant in 1972.

The species of this genus are found in Europe.

Species include:
 Jungiella consors
 Jungiella pseudolongicornis

References

Psychodidae